Brainwash or Brainwashing may refer to:

 Brainwashing, the concept that the human mind can be altered or controlled by certain psychological techniques.
 Hjernevask or Brainwash, a Norwegian popular science documentary series
 Brainwash, an extended play record by Spongehead
 Brainwash: The Secret History of Mind Control, a 2006 non-fiction book by Dominic Streatfeild
 Brainwashing: The Science of Thought Control, a 2004 non-fiction book by Kathleen Taylor
 Brain-Washing: A Synthesis of the Russian Textbook on Psychopolitics, a 1955 non-fiction book published by the Church of Scientology
 Mr. Brainwash, a French street artist and film-maker

See also 
 Re-education camp (disambiguation)